Raisapoana is a genus of moths of the family Tortricidae. It contains only one species, Raisapoana paraisoana, which is found in Goiás, Brazil.

The wingspan is about 13 mm. The ground colour of the forewings is brownish golden up to the middle and golden otherwise. The markings are dark golden brown, edged with dark brown. The hindwings are grey. Adults have been recorded on wing in May.

Etymology
The genus name is an anagram of the species name. The species name refers to the type locality, Alto Paraiso, Goiás, Brazil.

References

Archipini